Frescolita is a Venezuelan cola. It is very similar to red cream sodas in the United States, with a taste similar to gum. Frescolita is also used to bake in some places in Venezuela. It is marketed by The Coca-Cola Company. Its ingredients include carbonated water, sugar, sodium benzoate, citric acid, artificial color flavor. Besides Venezuela, it is available in stores that specialize in Latin American groceries in the United States and Europe.

While Coca-Cola is consumed more, it has been reported that Frescolita takes more of the general soft-drinks market of the country. Up to 45% of Coca-Cola's sales of soft drinks in Venezuela is in Hit, Frescolita and Chinotto.

References

Cola brands
Venezuelan brands
Venezuelan drinks
Coca-Cola brands